The Councils of Auxerre were local church councils held in the Ancient Diocese of Auxerre.

First Council of Auxerre

The first Council of Auxerre was held in 585 (or 578) by St. Annacharius. It formulated forty-five canons, closely related in context to canons of the contemporary Council of Lyon and Third Council of Mâcon.

Second Council of Auxerre

The second Council of Auxerre was presumably the last Frankish council before the 742/3 Concilium Germanicum. Its canons are concerned chiefly with the Divine Office and ecclesiastical ceremonies.

References

  Councils of Auxerre

Auxerre